Jason Fairbourne is a United States business consultant and educator. He is the founder of the Fairbourne Consulting Group, and is a Peery Fellow at the Ballard Center for Economic Self-Reliance at Brigham Young University’s Marriott School of Management. He is an advocate for microfranchising, defined as the systematization and replication of microenterprises in developing markets.

Fairbourne is the author of MicroFranchising: Creating Wealth at the Bottom of the Pyramid.

Bibliography
Books and articles by Jason Fairbourne:
 Fairbourne, Jason S., Gibson, Stephen W. & Gibb, W.: MicroFranchising: Creating Wealth at the Bottom of the Pyramid. Edward Elgar Pub, 2008, 
 Fairbourne, Jason, ‘Microfranchising’, Marriott Alumni Magazine, Summer 2007, Marriott School, Brigham Young University, at https://web.archive.org/web/20110719155524/http://marriottschool.byu.edu/marriottmag/summer07/features/atwork1.cfm (accessed May 15, 2008)
 Fairbourne, Jason, Lisa J. Christensen, and David Lehr. "A Good Business for Poor People." Stanford Social Innovation Review (2010): 43-49.

References

Living people
Year of birth missing (living people)